Peter Wilkinson may refer to:

Peter Wilkinson (diplomat) (1914–2000), British intelligence officer and diplomat
Peter Wilkinson (politician) (1934–1987), New Zealand politician
Peter Wilkinson (priest) (born 1940), Canadian priest
Peter Wilkinson (Royal Navy officer) (born 1956), British admiral
Peter Wilkinson (bass guitarist) (born 1969), British musician
Peter Wilkinson (drummer), British-Australian rock drummer
Pete Wilkinson, English racing driver